Lavandula stoechas, the Spanish lavender or topped lavender (U.S.) or French lavender (U.K.), is a species of flowering plant in the family  Lamiaceae, occurring natively in several Mediterranean countries, including France, Spain, Portugal, Italy and Greece.

Description
It is an evergreen shrub that usually grows to between 30 and 100 cm tall and occasionally up to 2 m (6.5 ft) tall in the subspecies L. stoechas subsp. luisieri. Its leaves are 1–4 cm long, greyish and tomentose. The inflorescence is crowned by a mass of purple elongated ovoid bracts about 5 cm long. Lower flowers form a tight rectangle in cross-section. The upper of the five teeth has a wrong-heart-shaped appendage. The crown is blackish-violet, up to 8 mm long and indistinct two-lipped.

At the top of the spike are a number of much larger, sterile bracts (no flowers between them), 10–50 mm long and bright lavender purple (rarely white). It blooms in spring and early summer, from the month of March in its native habitat, depending on the climate in which it grows.

The Latin specific epithet stoechas comes from the Greek stoichas meaning “in rows”. It is also the Greek name for this species.

Subspecies
The recognised subspecies are: 
L. stoechas pedunculata, the common type specific plant, once taxonomically considered L. pedunculata. There is considerable variation in this subspecies, and it may be split into a number of distinct forms. It is native to many coastal regions of the Mediterranean, with some populations on the Atlantic coasts of Morocco and Spain. 
L. stoechas luisieri, which has petals much less interconnected. It is found mainly in Portugal and adjacent regions of Spain.
L. stoechas subsp. sampaiana
L. stoechas subsp. lusitanica
L. stoechas subsp. atlantica
L. stoechas subsp. maderensis
L. stoechas subsp. cariensis

Cultivation
This species is more tender than common lavender (Lavandula angustifolia), being less frost-resistant, but harsher and more resinous in its oils. Like other lavenders, it is associated with hot, dry, sunny conditions in alkaline soils. However, it tolerates a range of situations, though it may be short-lived.

The following cultivars have won the Royal Horticultural Society's Award of Garden Merit:-
'Ballerina' 
'Pretty Polly'  
'Willow Vale'

Other uses
The flowers are used in aromatherapy to prepare infusions and essential oils that contain ketones (d-camphor and d-fenchone) and alcohols (borneol and terpineol).

Invasive species
Since its introduction into Australia, it has become an invasive species, widely distributed within the continent. It has been declared a noxious weed in Victoria since 1920. It also is regarded as a weed in parts of Spain.

Gallery

References

stoechas
Flora of Spain
Flora of Lebanon
Garden plants of Europe
Drought-tolerant plants
Flora of the Mediterranean Basin